Mohammed Yusuf (29 January 1970 – 30 July 2009), also known as Ustaz Mohammed Yusuf, was a Nigerian terrorist who founded the Islamist militant group Boko Haram in 2002. He was its leader until he was killed during the 2009 Boko Haram uprising. The group's official name is Jama'atu Ahlis Sunna Lidda'awati wal-Jihad, which in Arabic means "People Committed to the Propagation of the Teachings and Jihad".

Born in Girgir village, in Jakusko, present-day Yobe State, Nigeria, Yusuf received a local education. Later he studied more of Islam and became a Salafi.

Education and beliefs

According to scholar Paul Lubeck of the University of California at Santa Cruz, as a young man Yusuf was instructed in Shiasm and erroneously associated with Salafism and the teachings of Ibn Taymiyyah. He had the equivalent of a graduate education, according to Nigerian academic Hussain Zakaria. Yusuf was never as proficient in English as was reported. He believed in strict application of Islamic law, which represented his ideal of justice according to the teachings of the Islamic prophet, Muhammad. Boko Haram hitmen would murder members of other Muslim sects like the Salafist Izala and the Sufi Tidjaniyya and Qadiriya fraternities.
In a 2009 BBC interview, Yusuf stated his belief that the concept of a spherical Earth is contrary to Islamic teaching and should be rejected. He also rejected Darwinian evolution, and the concept of the condensation cycle that produces rain. In the interview he said:
"There are prominent Islamic preachers who have seen and understood that the present Western-style education is mixed with issues that run contrary to our beliefs in Islam," he said.

"Like rain. We believe it is a creation of God rather than an evaporation caused by the sun that condenses and becomes rain.

"Like saying the world is a sphere. If it runs contrary to the teachings of Allah, we reject it. We also reject the theory of Darwinism."

Personal life 
Yusuf had four wives and 12 children, one of them being Abu Musab al-Barnawi, who claimed since 2016 to be the rightful leader of Boko Haram, opposing Abubakar Shekau.

He was reported as living a lavish lifestyle, which included ownership and driving of a Mercedes-Benz.

Death
Following the July 2009 Boko Haram uprising, the Nigerian military captured Yusuf at his parents-in-law's house. They transferred him to the custody of the Nigerian police force. The police summarily executed Yusuf in public view outside the police headquarters in Maiduguri. Police officials initially claimed either that Yusuf was shot while trying to escape, or died of wounds he sustained during a gun battle with the military.

References

External links 
 Al Jazeera (9 February 2010), Video shows Nigeria 'executions'
 Duodu, Cameron (6 August 2009), "Mohammed Yusuf's final days", The Guardian
 Human Rights Watch (2012), "Spiraling Violence: Boko Haram Attacks and Security Force Abuses in Nigeria", 11 October 2012
 Murtada, Ahmad (2013), Boko Haram: Its Beginnings, Principles and Activities in Nigeria, Islamic Studies Department, University of Bayero, Kano, Nigeria

1970 births
2009 deaths
Boko Haram members
Deaths by firearm in Nigeria
People shot dead by law enforcement officers
Prisoners who died in Nigerian detention
Nigerian people who died in prison custody
People from Yobe State
Leaders of Islamic terror groups
Nigerian Salafis
Flat Earth proponents
Muslim creationists
Nigerian conspiracy theorists
Boko Haram